Worldwide Partners, Inc., (WPI), headquartered in Denver, Colorado, USA, is the world’s 10th largest advertising and marketing communications network comprising over 70 independent agencies located in 40 countries across Asia, Africa, Europe, Latin America, the Middle East and North America.

WPI’s partner agencies manage over $5 billion in worldwide advertising expenditures. John Harris is president and CEO, based in Denver.

References

Advertising agencies of the United States